Hoots Mon! is a 1940 British comedy film directed by Roy William Neill and starring Max Miller, Florence Desmond and Hal Walters. It follows an English comedian who attempts his luck on the Scottish stage, and develops a rivalry with a local performer. Miller sings "The Charabanc Song" and his signature tune "Mary from the Dairy".

Production
The film was produced  at Teddington Studios by Warner Brothers' British subsidiary. To comply with the 1927 Films Act the company was obliged to distribute a number of British-made films each year, and during the 1930s the company produced a large quantity of films at Teddington. 
It was the ninth and final film that the music hall star Miller made for Warner Brothers.

The film's sets were by Norman Arnold, the resident art director at Teddington.

Cast
 Max Miller as Harry Hawkins
 Florence Desmond as Jenny McTavish
 Hal Walters as Chips
 Davina Craig as Annie
 Garry Marsh as Charlie Thompson
 Edmund Willard as Sandy McBride
 Gordon McLeod as McDonald
 Robert Gall as Alec
 Mark Daly as Campbell

References

External links

1940 films
British comedy films
1940 comedy films
Films directed by Roy William Neill
Films set in England
Films set in London
Films set in Scotland
Films shot at Teddington Studios
Warner Bros. films
British black-and-white films
Films produced by Samuel Sax
1940s English-language films
1940s British films